Alexei Osipovich Ratmansky (born August 27, 1968) is a Russian-American choreographer and former ballet dancer. From 2004 to 2008 he was the director of the Bolshoi Ballet. He left Russia in 2008. As of April 2014 he was the artist in residence at the American Ballet Theatre.

Training and performance career
Ratmansky was born in St. Petersburg and trained under Pyotr Pestov and Alexandra Markeyeva at the Bolshoi Ballet School. He graduated in 1986.  He then danced in Kyiv and was a principal dancer with the Ukrainian National Ballet, Royal Winnipeg Ballet and Royal Danish Ballet.

Choreographic and administrative careers

Ratmansky's choreographic career first became notable with his staging of the ballet Dreams of Japan for the  State Ballet of Georgia in 1998.  Dreams and Charms of Mannerism, choreographed in 1997, were both created for Nina Ananiashvili. Dreams earned the Golden Mask Award from the Theatre Union of Russia.

Ratmansky is noted for restaging traditionally classical ballets for large companies.  His first three-act story ballet was Cinderella, created for the Kirov Ballet in 2002.  Ratmansky's 2003 staging of The Bright Stream (also translated as "The Limpid Stream") for the Bolshoi Ballet led to his appointment as artistic director of that company the following year. While there he also made a full-length production of The Bolt, in 2005, and re-staged Le Corsaire and the Flames of Paris, in 2007 and 2008.  The Critics' Circle in London has named the Bolshoi "Best Foreign Company" under Ratmansky's direction, in 2005 and 2007, and he received its National Dance Award for The Bright Stream.

After his directorship at the Bolshoi, Ratmansky agreed to become the first artist in residence for the American Ballet Theatre in 2008 after negotiations with the New York City Ballet failed over the position of resident choreographer. His ballets for the New York City Ballet include Russian Seasons and Concerto DSCH, and for the American Ballet Theatre, On the Dnieper and Seven Sonatas.

In 2011, his choreography of Prokofiev's Romeo and Juliet was premiered by the National Ballet of Canada in Toronto.  Its performance in London earned Ratmansky the praise from New York Times reviewer Alastair Macaulay of being "the most gifted choreographer specializing in classical ballet today."

In 2014, Ratmansky took his career in a new direction when he reconstructed Marius Petipa's final revival of Paquita from the Sergeyev Collection. The reconstruction was premièred in Munich in December 2014, performed by the Bavarian State Ballet. In March 2015, he mounted his second Petipa reconstruction for American Ballet Theatre - The Sleeping Beauty, which premièred in Orange County and was later staged at the Teatro alla Scala. Ratmansky is currently reconstructing the Petipa/Ivanov 1895 staging of Swan Lake, which was premièred in Zurich in February 2016.

In January 2023 the New York City Ballet announced that Ratmansky will join them as an artist in residence in August 2023.

Choreographed works

1988: La Sylphide-88, Duet-buff #1 & 2
1993: Pas de Graham
1994: The Fairy's Kiss, Alborada, Whipped Cream, 98 steps
1995: Hurluburlu, Poor Little Things
1996: Sarabande
1997: Charms of Mannerism, Capriccio, Krakowyak, Old Juniet's Carriol
1998: Dreams of Japan, Middle Duet, Poem of Extazy, Fairy's Kiss (2nd version)
1999: Water, Chrizantemums
2001: Turandot's Dream, Flight to Budapest, Leah, The Nutcracker
2002: Cinderella, Vers la Flamme, The Firebird
2003: The Bright Stream, Carnaval des Animaux, Bolero
2004: Anna Karenina, Leah (2nd version)
2005: The Bolt, Jeu de cartes
2006: Russian Seasons
2007: Le Corsaire (after Mazilier & Petipa, with Yuri Burlaka), Old Women Falling Out
2008: Biset Variations, Pierrot Lunaire, Concerto DSCH, Flames of Paris (after Vainonen)
2009: The Little Humpbacked Horse, Valse-Fantasie, On the Dnieper, Scuola di Ballo, Seven Sonatas
2010: Don Quixote (after Petipa & Gorsky), Namouna, Fandango, The Nutcracker (2nd version)
2011: Lost Illusions, Dumbarton, Psyche, Romeo & Juliet
2012: Souvenir d'un Lieu Cher, Symphonic Dances, The Firebird (2nd version), The Golden Cockerel, Symphony No. 9
2013: 24 Preludes, From Foreign Lands, Chamber Symphony, Piano Concerto No. 1, Cinderella (2nd version), Opera, The Tempest
2014: Tanzsuite, Pictures at an Exhibition, Rondo Capriccioso
2016: Serenade After Plato’s Symposium
2017:  Whipped Cream, Odessa, Songs of Bukovina, Romeo & Juliet
2022: Wartime Elegy

Reconstructions
2014: Paquita
2015: The Sleeping Beauty
2016: Swan Lake
2018: Harlequinade, La Bayadère2019: Giselle

Awards
Ratmansky received the 2005 and 2014 Prix Benois de la Danse for choreography for, respectively, Anna Karenina, put on for the Royal Danish Ballet, and Shostakovich Trilogy and The Tempest, put on for the American Ballet Theatre. He also received the 2007 Golden Mask Award for Best Choreographer for Jeu de Cartes choreographed for the Bolshoi Ballet.

In 2013, Ratmansky was named as the MacArthur Fellow of the year, an award that came with "genius grant" for "working in any field, who "show exceptional merit and promise for continued and enhanced creative work". (http://www.macfound.org/fellows/900/)

References

External links
ABT website 
"Dance of Death" by Judith Mackrell, an article in The Guardian''
Archive film of Alexei Ratmansky's Charms of Mannerism in 1999 at Jacob's Pillow

1968 births
Living people
American Ballet Theatre
Choreographers of Bolshoi Theatre
Prix Benois de la Danse winners
Royal Danish Ballet principal dancers
Royal Winnipeg Ballet principal dancers
Russian male ballet dancers
Choreographers of New York City Ballet
Choreographers of American Ballet Theatre
Alexei Ratmansky
MacArthur Fellows
20th-century Russian ballet dancers